The 1926 Kansas City Cowboys season was their third and final season in the league. The team improved on their previous output of 2–5–1, winning eight games. They finished fourth in the league.

Schedule

Standings

References

Kansas City Cowboys seasons
Kansas City Cowboys
Kansas City